John Cronin (born May 1, 1980) is an American former ice hockey player who played three seasons of professional hockey in the American Hockey League and ECHL from 2003–05. He was selected by the Boston Bruins in the 8th round (236th overall) of the 1999 NHL Entry Draft. He graduated from Noble and Greenough School High School, and was drafted as a senior, playing four years at Boston University.

References

External links 

1980 births
Alaska Aces (ECHL) players
American men's ice hockey defensemen
Augusta Lynx players
Boston Bruins draft picks
Cincinnati Cyclones (ECHL) players
Ice hockey players from Massachusetts
Living people
Noble and Greenough School alumni
People from Duxbury, Massachusetts